The 2006–07 Pakistan Premier League season was the 3rd season since the inception of Pakistan Premier League and 52nd season of Pakistan domestic football. The football season was moved from the summer to the winter months. 

Pakistan Army ended the season as league champions, successfully defending the title and winning their second title in three years.

Pakistan Army keeper Jaffar Khan set a new Pakistani record by remaining unbeaten for 1,260 minutes. Pakistan Army only conceding 3 goals is a new record.

Pakistan Army represented Pakistan at the 2007 AFC President's Cup by virtue of being the national champions. The AFC President's Cup 2007 will be staged in Lahore.

The relegation spots were occupied Habib Bank and Pakistan Telecommunication, who withdrew before the start of the league.

Teams
Panther Club and Pakistan Public Work Department were relegated at the end of the 2005–06 season and were replaced by B-Division winners and runner-up Pakistan Railways and Karachi Electric Supply Corporation.

League table

Statistics

Scoring
 First goal of the season: Siraj-ud-Din for Afghan Chaman against Wohaib (10 September 2006).
 Last goal of the season: Muhammad Ali for Afghan Chaman against Pakistan Navy(1 February 2007).
 Fastest goal of the season: 2 minutes
 Shakir Lashari for Karachi Electric Supply Corporation against National Bank (25 December 2006).
 Nasir Hussain for Pakistan Navy against Karachi Electric Supply Corporation (29 December 2006).
 Largest winning margin: 6 goals
 WAPDA 6–0 Karachi Port Trust (12 September 2006).
 WAPDA 6–0 National Bank (14 September 2006).
 Wohaib 0–6 Karachi Port Trust (14 September 2006).
 Highest scoring game: 6 goals
 WAPDA 6–0 Karachi Port Trust (12 September 2006).
 WAPDA 6–0 National Bank (14 September 2006).
 Wohaib 0–6 Karachi Port Trust (14 September 2006).
 Karachi Port Trust 4–2 Wohaib (13 January 2007).
 Karachi Electric Supply Corporation 2–4 WAPDA (25 January 2007).
 Most goals scored in a match by a single team: 6 goals
 WAPDA 6–0 Karachi Port Trust (12 September 2006).
 WAPDA 6–0 National Bank (14 September 2006).
 Wohaib 0–6 Karachi Port Trust (14 September 2006).
 Most goals scored in a match by a losing team: 2 goals
 Karachi Port Trust 3–2 Pakistan Navy (24 December 2006).
 Karachi Port Trust 4–2 Wohaib (13 January 2007).
 Pakistan Navy 2–3 Khan Research Laboratories (15 January 2007).
 Karachi Electric Supply Corporation 2–4 WAPDA (25 January 2007).

Top scorers

Hat-tricks

References

Pakistan Premier League seasons
1
Pakistan